This page shows the results of the 65th edition of the Gent–Wevelgem cycling classic over 204 kilometres, held on Wednesday 9 April 2003. There were a total of 164 competitors, 49 of whom finished the race. The winner was Germany's Andreas Klier.

Final classification

References

External links
Official race website

2003
2003 in road cycling
2003 in Belgian sport
April 2003 sports events in Europe